The Next Generation Supersonic Transport is a supersonic transport (SST) being developed by the Japanese Space Agency JAXA. By comparison to the Concorde this new design will carry three times as many passengers and fly roughly at the same speed (Mach 2) . It also has twice the range. The goal is to achieve a ticket price comparable to that of commercial business class. JAXA had expected to launch the plane by 2015. An 11.5-meter prototype was tested on October 10, 2005.

One of the most crucial factors in the commercial viability of a supersonic transport is the strength of the sonic boom it generates. The boom created by Concorde was powerful enough to prevent the aircraft from flying supersonically over land, which eliminated many possible passenger routes and contributing to the cancellation of Concorde's American rival, the Boeing 2707. Since the 1960's a number of techniques have been developed that may reduce the effect (see the sonic boom article). On May 9, 2008, JAXA announced it would collaborate with NASA to conduct joint research on sonic boom modeling.

JAXA is also researching hypersonic transport (Mach 5.0+) , though the goal is not use for commercial aircraft cost competitive with current aircraft.

See also
Supersonic transport
Sonic boom

Notes

References
 

Supersonic transports